Stephan Ulamec is an Austrian geophysicist, from Salzburg, with more than 100 articles in peer-reviewed journals and several participations in space missions and payloads operated by diverse space agencies. He is working at the German Aerospace Center (Deutsches Zentrum für Luft- und Raumfahrt, DLR) in Cologne. He is regularly giving lectures about his publications in aerospace engineering at the University of Applied Sciences: Fachhochschule FH-Aachen. Main aspects of his work are related to the exploration of small bodies in the solar system (asteroids and comets).

Education
Ulamec studied Geophysics at the Karl-Franzens University in Graz (Austria) as student of Prof. Siegfried J. Bauer. He finished his PhD on “Acoustic and Electrical Methods for the Exploration of Atmospheres and Surfaces, with Application to Saturn's Moon Titan” in 1991.

Career
From 1991 till 1993 he worked as a research fellow at the European Space Agency (ESA), specifically at European Space Research and Technology Centre (ESTEC) in Noordwijk, in The Netherlands. Since 1994, he is at the Microgravity User Support Center (MUSC) which is part of the DLR Space Operations and Astronaut Training (SOAT). He has made several presentations at the International Astronautical Congress (IAC).

Involvement in space missions

Mission to 67P/Churyumov-Gerasimenko 

Stephan Ulamec has been the project manager of the Rosetta lander Philae, which successfully landed on comet 67P/Churyumov-Gerasimenko in 2014.

Mission to (162173) Ryugu 

He has also been Payload Manager of MASCOT, a  lander made in common by the French space agency (CNES) and the DLR, that has been delivered by the JAXA Hayabusa2 spacecraft to asteroid (162173) Ryugu in 2018.

Mission to Phobos (Mars I) 

Stephan Ulamec is one of two lead scientists of the French-German MMX rover (CNES - DLR), together with Dr Patrick Michel, to be launched in 2024 by the Japanese Mars Moons eXploration (MMX), a  JAXA mission to the Mars natural satellite Phobos.

Mission to (65803) Didymos 

He is also part of the Science Management Board for the ESA Hera mission, to be launched in 2024 with a Space X Falcon 9 shuttle, aimed at operating a rendezvous and characterising in details the asteroid (65803) Didymos and its natural satellite Dimorphos, and also analysing the artificial impact created by the American space agency NASA probe DART in September 2022.

Involvement in other projects and working groups

NEO-MAPP 
He is involved in NEO-MAPP, a European Union Horizon 2020 project to study mitigation and characterisation techniques for potentially hazardous asteroids.

SSEWG and SSAC 
From January 2020 till June 2023, he is chairing the ESA Solar System and Exploration Working Group (SSEWG) and is a member of the Space Science Advisory Committee (SSAC).

Writings 
Raumsonde Rosetta.
Handbuch der Raumfahrttechnik, chapter on Weltraumastronomie und Planetenmissionen.
Spacecraft Operations, chapter on Lander Operations.

Awards and honours 
 Member of International Academy of Astronautics (IAA).
 Member of European Geosciences Union (EGU).
 Asteroid (11818) Ulamec was named in his honour by the International Astronomical Union (IAU).
 Sir Arthur Clark Award, 2014.
 Wernher von Braun Ehrung (in german, honour) by the German Society for Aeronautics and Astronautics (DGLR), 2015.

Representative publications 

 Ulamec S. and Biele J.; Surface elements and landing strategies for small bodies missions – Philae and beyond, Adv. Space Res., Vol. 44, pp. 847–858, https://www.sciencedirect.com/science/article/pii/S0273117709003858, 2009
 Ulamec, S., Kucherenko, V., Biele, J., Bogatchev, A., Makurin, A. and Matrossov, S., Hopper concepts for small bodies landers, Adv. Space Res., Vol. 47, pp. 428–439, https://www.researchgate.net/publication/224991819_Hopper_concepts_for_small_body_landers, 2011
 Stephan Ulamec, Jens Biele, Pierre-W. Bousquet, Philippe Gaudon, Koen Geurts, Tra-Mi Ho, Christian Krause, Caroline Lange, Rainer Willnecker, Lars Witte and the Philae and MASCOT teams, Landing on small bodies: From the Rosetta Lander to MASCOT and beyond, Acta Astron., Vol. 93, pp. 460–466, https://www.sciencedirect.com/science/article/pii/S0094576513000556, 2014
 S. Ulamec, J. Biele, A. Blazquez, B. Cozzoni, C. Fantinati, P. Gaudon, K. Geurts, E. Jurado, O. Küchemann, V. Lommatsch, M. Maibaum, H. Sierks and L. Witte,     Rosetta Lander – Philae: landing preparations, Acta Astron., Vol. 107, pp. 79–86, https://www.sciencedirect.com/science/article/pii/S0094576514004512, 2015
 J. Biele, S. Ulamec, M. Maibaum, R. Roll, L. Witte, J. Pablo Muñoz, W. Arnold, H.-U. Auster, C. Casas, C. Faber, C. Fantinati, F. Finke, H.-H. Fischer, K. Geurts, C. Güttler, P. Heinisch, A.  Herique, S. Hviid, G. Kargl, M. Knapmeyer, J. Knollenberg, W. Kofman, N. Kömle, E. Kührt, V.Lommatsch, S. Mottola, R. P. de Santayana, E. Remetean, F. Scholten, K.  Seidensticker, H.  Sierks and T. Spohn, The landing(s) of  Philae and inferences about comet surface mechanical properties. Science 349, aaa9816, https://www.science.org/doi/10.1126/science.aaa9816, 2015
 F. Goesmann, H. Rosenbauer,J. H. Bredehöft, M. Cabane, P. Ehrenfreund, T. Gautier, C. Giri, H. Krüger, L. Le Roy, A. J. MacDermott, S. McKenna-Lawlor, U. J. Meierhenrich, G. M. Muñoz Caro, F. Raulin, R. Roll, A. Steele, H. Steininger, R. Sternberg, C. Szopa, W. Thiemann and S. Ulamec, Organic compounds on comet 67P/Churyumov-Gerasimenko revealed by COSAC mass spectrometry. Science 349, aab0689, https://www.science.org/doi/10.1126/science.aab0689, 2015
 Ulamec, S, Fantinati, C. Maibaum, M., Geurts, K., Biele, J., Jansen, S., Küchemann, O., Cozzoni, B., Finke, F.,  Lommatsch, V., Moussi-Soffys, A., Delmas, C.     and  O´Rourke, L., Rosetta Lander – Landing and operations on comet 67P/Churyumov–Gerasimenko, Acta Astron., Vol. 125, pp. 80–91, https://www.sciencedirect.com/science/article/pii/S0094576515004336, 2016
 Jaumann, R., Schmitz, N., Ho, T.-M., Schröder, S.E., Otto, K.A., Stephan, K.,  Elgner, S., Krohn, K., Preusker, F., Scholten, F., Biele, J., Ulamec, S., Krause, C., Sugita, S.,  Matz, K.-D., Roatsch, T., Parekh, R., Mottola, S., Grott, M., Michel, P., Trauthan, F., Koncz, A., Michaelis, H., Lange, C., Grundmann, J.T., Maibaum, M., Sasaki, K., Wolff, F., Reill, J., Moussi-Soffys, A., Lorda, L., Neumann, W., Vincent, J.-B., Wagner, R., Bibring, J.-P., Kameda, S., Yano, H., Watanabe, S., Yoshikawa, M., Tsuda, Y., Okada, T., Yoshimitsu, T., Mimasu, Y., Saiki, T., Yabuta, H., Rauer H., Honda, R., Morota, T., Yokota, Y. and Kouyama, T., In-situ investigation of asteroid (162173) Ryugu by the Mobile Asteroid Surface Scout (MASCOT) Camera (MASCam), Science, Vol. 365, pp. 817–820, https://europlanet.dlr.de/Hayabusa2/MASCAM/index.html, 2019
 Thomas, N., Ulamec, S., Kührt, E., Ciarletti, V., Gundlach, B., Yoldi, Z., Schwehm, G., Snodgrass, C. and Green, S.F., Towards new comet missions, Space Sci. Rev., 215:47, https://link.springer.com/article/10.1007/s11214-019-0611-0, 2019
 Michel, P., Ulamec, S., Böttger, U, Grott, M., Murdoch, N., Vernazza, P., Sunday, C. Zhang, Y., Valette, R., Castellani, R., Biele, J., Tardivel, S., Groussin, O. and Jorda L., The MMX rover: performing in-situ surface investigations on Phobos, Earth, Planets and Space, 74:2, https://doi.org/10.1186/s40623-021-01464-7, 2022
 Michel, P., Küppers, M., Campo Bagatin, A., Carry, B., Charnoz, S., de Leon, J., Fitzsimmons, A., Gordo, P., Green, S.F., Hérique, A., Juzi, M., Karatekin, Ö., Kohout, T., Lazzarin, M., Murdoch, N., Okada, T., Palomba, E., Pravec, P., Snodgrass, C., Tortore, P., Tsiganis, K., Ulamec, S., Vincent, J.-B., Wünnemann, K., Zhang, Y., Raducan, S.D., Dotto, E., Chabot, N., Cheng, A.F., Rivkin, A., Barnouin, O., Ernst, C., Stickle, A., Richardson, D.C., Thomas, C., Arakawa, M., Miyamoto, H., Nakamura, A., Sugita, S., Yoshikawa, M., Abell, P., Asphaug, E., Ballouz, R.-L., Bottke, W.F., Lauretta, D.S., Walsh, K.J., Martino, P. and Carnelli, I., The ESA Hera mission: Detailed Characterization of the DART Impact Outcome and of the Binary Asteroid (65803) Didymos, Planetary Science Journal, 3:160 https://doi.org/10.3847/PSJ/ac6f52, 2022

References

Further reading

Related articles 

 Geophysics
 Near Earth Objects
 Rovers
 Solar System

Official agencies external links 
 https://www.gov.uk/government/news/philae-finds-hard-ice-and-organic-molecules
 https://www.esa.int/esatv/Videos/2014/09/Rosetta_Mission_Status/Stephan_Ulamec_Philae_Lander_Manager_DLR_ITV_in_German
 https://www.esa.int/esatv/Videos/2014/11/Rosetta_wrap_up
 https://www.esa.int/ESA_Multimedia/Videos/2016/02/Philae_facing_eternal_hibernation
 https://www.eso.org/public/archives/capjournals/pdf/capj_0019.pdf (An Historic Encounter: Reviewing the Outreach around ESA’s Rosetta Mission: pages 44 to 47)

Media coverage 
 Comet lander's scientific harvest may be its last: Philae has fallen silent after fragmentary messages
 The return of Philae: Revived after hibernation, comet lander awaits orders
 (in French) https://www.sudouest.fr/sciences-et-technologie/mission-rosetta-il-est-temps-de-dire-au-revoir-a-philae-3689370.php
 https://www.science.org/content/article/philae-s-scientific-harvest-may-be-its-last
 https://www.nature.com/articles/nature.2015.17488
 https://www.nature.com/articles/d41586-018-05544-9
 https://www.scientificamerican.com/article/asteroid-ryugu-poses-landing-risks-for-japanese-mission/
 https://www.theguardian.com/science/2015/apr/14/rise-and-shine-rosettas-philae-probe-could-be-awake-within-weeks
 https://www.dailymotion.com/video/x30qpfs
 https://www.irishtimes.com/news/science/philae-lander-goes-to-sleep-after-sending-data-to-earth-1.2002692
 https://spacenews.com/esa-moves-two-missions-to-falcon-9/

Geophysicists
Astronomers
Austrian scientists
Year of birth missing (living people)
Living people